Corrado Pizziolo (born 23 December 1949) is an Italian prelate of the Roman Catholic Church. He currently serves as Bishop
of Vittorio Veneto.

Biography
Corrado Pizziolo was born in Scandolara di Zero Branco, and studied at the minor and major seminaries in Treviso. He was ordained to the priesthood on 20 September 1975 and then served as parochial vicar of the parish of San Martino di Lupari until 1981. From 1981 to 1985, he was an assistant of the Major Seminary of Treviso. Pizziolo continued his studies at the Theological Faculty of Northern Italy, from where he later obtained his licentiate in theology.

In 1985, he became professor of dogmatic theology at the Interdiocesan Theological Institute of Treviso-Vittorio Veneto and at the School of Theology for Laymen in Treviso. After being appointed to the Permanent Formation of Young Clergy in 1994, Pizziolo was named episcopal vicar for the diocesan synod in 1998, episcopal delegate for the Permanent Formation of the Clergy in 1999, and vicar general of and curial moderator of the Diocese of Treviso in 2002. He was also made a canon of the cathedral chapter in 2001 and chaired the Commission for the Permanent Diaconate and the Administrative Council of the House of Clergy in Treviso.

In September 2007, following the centennial anniversary of Pascendi dominici gregis of Pope Pius X, he emphasized the relevance of Pope Pius's claims against Modernism to current times, saying, "it must also be affirmed that many of the solutions proposed [by the Modernists] were not compatible with the Catholic faith. This led to the need for intervention by the Magisterium".

On 19 November 2007 Pizziolo was appointed Bishop of Vittorio Veneto by Pope Benedict XVI. He received his episcopal consecration on 26 January 2008 from Bishop Andrea Bruno Mazzocato, with Bishops Paolo Magnani and Alfredo Magarotto serving as co-consecrators.

References

External links

Catholic-Hierarchy
Diocese of Vittorio Veneto

1949 births
Living people
21st-century Italian Roman Catholic bishops
Bishops in Veneto
People from Zero Branco